Chardon is a city in and the county seat of Geauga County, Ohio, United States. The population was 5,242 at the 2020 census. It is the only incorporated city in Geauga County, and includes land that was once part of Chardon, Hambden and Munson townships. It is located about 10 miles south of Lake Erie and within the "snow belt" of the Great Lakes.

History

Chardon is named after Peter Chardon Brooks, who donated land to build the historic Chardon Square. Chardon Township celebrates its incorporation in 1812, and thus the City of Chardon does the same.

On July 24–25, 1868, a massive fire totally destroyed the center of uptown, the area now known as Chardon Square.  The fire originated in the Parlin Parkin's grocery store, and spread rapidly. By the time the fire was contained, the courthouse, post office, and many stores on the square were destroyed. Damage was estimated at around $120,000. Chardon Square was quickly rebuilt following the fire.  A new county courthouse, which still stands today, was completed in 1869. Many other buildings that were constructed after the fire also survive and are used today.

Chardon High School shooting

On February 27, 2012, a student from Lake Academy in Willoughby, Ohio opened fire at the Chardon High School cafeteria, killing three and injuring two students. Daniel Parmertor, 16 years old, was killed at the time of the shooting. Two other victims, Demetrius Hewlin and Russell King, Jr., were pronounced dead on February 28.  The shooter was taken into custody by police and was charged with three counts of aggravated murder. He was sentenced to three consecutive life terms in prison without parole.

Geography and climate

Geography

Climate

Governor George Voinovich declared a state of emergency as a result, and the Ohio National Guard was brought in to assist with the cleanup.

Chardon has a humid continental climate (Dfb). Summer days are warm to hot while nights remain cool. Summer is also the rainiest time of the year. Winters are moderately long, cold, and very snowy. Precipitation peaks during the month of August.

Demographics

As of the census of 2000, there were 5,156 people, 2,147 households, and 1,344 families residing in the city. The population density was 1,120.1 people per square mile (432.8/km2). There were 2,271 housing units at an average density of 493.3/sq mi (190.6/km2). The racial makeup of the city was 97.77% White, 0.43% African American, 0.02% Native American, 0.45% Asian, 0.02% Pacific Islander, 0.10% from other races, and 1.22% from two or more races. Hispanic or Latino of any race were 0.47% of the population.

There were 2,147 households, out of which 30.5% had children under the age of 18 living with them, 49.7% were married couples living together, 9.9% had a female householder with no husband present, and 37.4% were non-families. 32.9% of all households were made up of individuals, and 13.7% had someone living alone who was 65 years of age or older. The average household size was 2.35 and the average family size was 3.02.

In the city the population was spread out, with 24.9% under the age of 18, 6.9% from 18 to 24, 29.9% from 25 to 44, 22.5% from 45 to 64, and 15.8% who were 65 years of age or older. The median age was 37 years. For every 100 females, there were 84.9 males. For every 100 females age 18 and over, there were 79.3 males.

The median income for a household in the city was $54,063, and the median income for a family was $57,845. Males had a median income of $44,071 versus $23,750 for females. The per capita income for the city was $21,845. About 1.3% of families and 3.8% of the population were below the poverty line, including 0.6% of those under age 18 and 7.8% of those age 65 or over.

2010 census
As of the census of 2010, there were 5,148 people, 2,285 households, and 1,331 families residing in the city. The racial makeup of the city was 96.9% White, 0.8% Black, 0.2% Native American, 0.6% Asian, 0.2% from other races, and 1.3% from two or more races. Hispanic or Latino of any race were 1.5% of the population.

There were 2,285 households, of which 29.1% had children under the age of 18 living with them, 42.1% were married couples living together, 12.2% had a female householder with no husband present, 3.9% had a male householder with no wife present, and 41.8% were non-families. 37.4% of all households were made up of individuals, and 15.8% had someone living alone who was 65 years of age or older. The average household size was 2.21 and the average family size was 2.94.

The median age in the city was 41.1 years. 23.5% of residents were under the age of 18; 7.4% were between the ages of 18 and 24; 24.8% were from 25 to 44; 26.5% were from 45 to 64; and 17.7% were 65 years of age or older. The gender makeup of the city was 45.1% male and 54.9% female.

Culture

Chardon is known for its maple syrup industry. Celebration of the syrup season begins at Tapping Sunday in March, when the sap is at prime thawing temperature.  The annual Geauga County Maple Festival is a four-day celebration that takes place on the Chardon Square the last weekend in April. The festival has been rescheduled numerous times because of snowstorms in April due to Chardon's location in the “snow belt” of the Great Lakes; it receives a large amount of snowfall every year.

Chardon has an active performance art community. The Geauga Lyric Theater Guild is housed in the renovated Geauga Theater building, which was constructed in 1939 as an Art Deco movie house. The theater is also being used again to show first-run movies.

Greater Chardon features numerous parks and golf courses. Chardon Lakes Golf Course is located in the heart of Chardon, two minutes from the square. Sand Ridge Golf Club in nearby Munson Township is also an excellent course. Chardon has an abundance of park space. Due to the area's varying weather conditions, sports activities are available for every season.

The 1987 Film, Planes, Trains, and Automobiles had a scene filmed in Chardon. The scene where John Candy and Steve Martin are riding in the back of the pickup truck was filmed on Taylor Wells Rd in Chardon.

Education
Chardon and the area surrounding the city are served by the Chardon Local School District. The district contains Chardon High School, as well as one middle school, and two elementary schools: Park and Munson. Hambden and Maple were no longer elementary schools starting in the 2018–2019 school year. Hambden and Munson elementary are not within the city limits. As of the 2011–2012 school year, the district had received an "Excellent" rating from the State of Ohio Board of Education for eleven consecutive years.

Chardon has a public library, a branch of the Geauga County Public Library.

Notable people
 Andrew Brown, professional baseball pitcher
  Hector (Chef Boyardee) Boioardi, is buried in All Souls Cemetery in Chardon
 Mel Harder, professional baseball pitcher for the Cleveland Guardians 
 Matt Hutter, NASCAR driver
 Leroy Kemp, collegiate and Olympian wrestler
 Tom Kipp, international professional motorcycle racing champion.
 Charles C. Paine, politician
 Halbert Eleazer Paine, Union general and U.S. Representative from Wisconsin
 Seth Ledyard Phelps, naval officer, politician and diplomat
 Christopher Robichaud, philosopher, Harvard University professor
 Nick Schuyler, author (Not Without Hope)
 JoAnn M. Tenorio, entomologist in Hawaii

Musical artists & groups
 Midnight Syndicate, Gothic Symphonic duo
 John Popper, frontman for rock band Blues Traveler
 The Chardon Polka Band, Cleveland-Style polka band

References

External links

 City of Chardon

 
Cities in Ohio
Cities in Geauga County, Ohio
County seats in Ohio
Populated places established in 1812
1812 establishments in Ohio
Cleveland metropolitan area